Cahoon Hollow Beach is a beach in the Cape Cod National Seashore in Wellfleet, Massachusetts.  It was named for the Cahoon family who had lived on the Outer Cape for many years.

References

Beaches of Massachusetts
Cape Cod National Seashore
Landforms of Barnstable County, Massachusetts
Tourist attractions in Barnstable County, Massachusetts
Wellfleet, Massachusetts